Mohammadabad (also Romanized as Moḩammadābād; also known as Moḩammadābād-e Sar Chāh-e Shūr) is a village in Qaleh Zari Rural District, Jolgeh-e Mazhan District, Khusf County, South Khorasan Province, Iran. At the 2006 census, its population was 25, in 6 families.

References 

Populated places in Khusf County